Chersonesus (modern Russian and Ukrainian: Херсоне́с, Khersones; also rendered as Chersonese, Chersonesos, contracted in medieval Greek to Cherson Χερσών; Old East Slavic: Корсунь, Korsun) is an ancient Greek colony founded approximately 2,500 years ago in the southwestern part of the Crimean Peninsula. Settlers from Heraclea Pontica in Bithynia established the colony in the 6th century BC.

The ancient city is located on the shore of the Black Sea on the outskirts of present-day Sevastopol on the Crimean Peninsula, where it is referred to as Khersones. The site is part of the National Preserve of Tauric Chersonesos. The name Chersonesos in Greek means "peninsula" and aptly describes the site on which the colony was established. It should not be confused with the Tauric Chersonese, a name often applied to the whole of the southern Crimea.

During much of the classical period, Chersonesus operated as a democracy ruled by a group of elected archons and a council called the Demiurgoi. As time passed, the government grew more oligarchic, with power concentrated in the hands of the archons. A form of oath sworn by all the citizens from the 3rd century BC onwards has survived to the present day.
In 2013 UNESCO listed Chersonesus as a World Heritage Site.

History

Greek colony 

After defending itself against the Bosporan Kingdom, and the native Scythians and Tauri, and even extending its power over the west coast of the peninsula, it was compelled to call in the aid of Mithradates VI and his general Diophantus, c. 110 BC, and submitted to the Bosporan Kingdom. It was subject to Rome and received a garrison from the middle of the 1st century BC until the 370s AD, when it was captured by the Huns.

Byzantine era 
It became a Byzantine possession during the Early Middle Ages and withstood a siege by the Göktürks in 581. Byzantine rule was slight: there was a small imperial garrison more for the town's protection than for its control and it exercised a measure of self-government. It was useful to Byzantium in two ways: it was an observation point to watch the barbarian tribes, and its isolation made it a popular place of exile for those who angered the Roman and later Byzantine governments. Among its more famous "inmates" were Pope Clement I and Pope Martin I, and the deposed Byzantine Emperor Justinian II.

According to Theophanes the Confessor and others, Chersonesus was the residence of a Khazar governor (tudun) in the late 7th century. Between approximately 705 and 840, the city's affairs were managed by elected officials called babaghuq, meaning "father of the city".

In 833, Emperor Theophilus sent the nobleman Petronas Kamateros, who had recently overseen the construction of the Khazar fortress of Sarkel, to take direct control over the city and its environs, establishing the theme of Klimata/Cherson. It remained in Byzantine hands until the 980s, when it reportedly fell to Vladimir the Great of the Kievan Rus'. Vladimir agreed to evacuate the fortress only if Basil II's sister Anna Porphyrogeneta would be given him in marriage. The demand caused a scandal in Constantinople. As a pre-condition for the marriage settlement, Vladimir was baptized here in 988, thus paving the way to the Baptism of Kievan Rus'. Thereafter Korsun' was evacuated.

Since this campaign is not recorded in Greek sources, historians have suggested that the account actually refers to the events of the Rus'–Byzantine War (1043) and to a different Vladimir. In fact, most valuables looted by the Slavs in Korsun' made their way to Novgorod (perhaps by way of Joachim the Korsunian, the first Novgorodian bishop, as his surname indicates ties to Korsun), where they were preserved in the Cathedral of Holy Wisdom until the 20th century. One of the most interesting items from this "Korsun Treasure" is the copper Korsun Gate, supposedly captured by the Novgorodians in Korsun' and now part of the St. Sophia Cathedral.

After the Fourth Crusade (1202–04), Chersonesus became dependent on the Byzantine Empire of Trebizond as the Principality of Theodoro. After the Siege of Trebizond (1461) the Principality of Theodoro became independent. The city fell under Genoese control in the early 13th century, which forebode the Greeks to trade there. In 1299, the town was sacked by the Mongol armies of Nogai Khan's Golden Horde. Byzantine sources last mention Chersonesus in 1396, and based on archaeological evidence the site is presumed to have been abandoned in the following decades.

Ecclesiastical history 
Chersonesus had been a Roman pre-Great Schism, later Greek/Orthodox, episcopal see for centuries, elevated early to the rank of archbishopric, since it is mentioned as such in the Notitiae Episcopatuum; it disappeared after the Turkish conquest in 1475 and the destruction of the city.

In the late 19th century, the grand Russian Orthodox St Vladimir's Cathedral (completed 1892) was built on a small hill overlooking the site; designed in Byzantine style, it was intended to commemorate the site of Vladimir's baptism.

In 1333, the Roman Catholic Archdiocese of Chersonesus in Zechia was established, but it appears that it had only a bishop, a Dominican called Richard the Englishman.  It is today listed by the Catholic Church as a titular archbishopric, and is called specifically Chersonesus in Zechia to avoid confusion with other sees called Chersonesus.

Remains

Archaeological site 

Chersonesus's ancient ruins are presently located in one of Sevastopol's suburbs. They were excavated by the Russian government, starting from 1827. They are today a popular tourist attraction, protected as an archaeological park.

The buildings mix influences of Greek, Roman and Byzantine culture. Buildings include a Roman amphitheatre and a Greek temple. The fact that the site has not been inhabited since the 14th century makes it an important representation of Byzantine life.

The surrounding land under the control of the city, the chora, consists of several square kilometres of ancient but now barren farmland, with remains of wine presses and defensive towers. According to archaeologists, the evidence suggests that the locals were paid to do the farm work instead of being enslaved.

The excavated tombstones hint at burial practices that were different from the Greek ones. Each stone marks the tomb of an individual, instead of the whole family and the decorations include only objects like sashes and weapons, instead of burial statues. Over half of the tombs archaeologists have found have bones of children. Burned remnants suggest that the city was plundered and destroyed.

In 2007, Chersonesus tied for fifth in the Seven Wonders of Ukraine poll.

On February 13, 2009, Ukrainian Defence Minister Yuriy Yekhanurov called on Russia's Black Sea naval fleet to move its automobile depot from the site to another place. The location of the Russian Black Sea naval fleet's automobile depot was one of the obstacles to the inclusion of the reserve on UNESCO's list of world heritage sites.

In 2017, archaeologists discovered on the outskirts of Sevastopol, fragments of an ancient Greek altar with figures of gods.

In 2022, researchers analyzed human skeletal remains from a necropolis in the northern part of Chersonesus, dating to the earliest period of the colony (between the 5th and the 4th century BC). Most of the deceased individuals were positioned in a flexed burial position with their legs crouched and folded up to the chest, while a smaller number were buried in an extended position on their back with arms and legs straight. The researchers found that most individuals were genetically similar to each other, regardless of the burial position. This result challenges the widely held opinion that burial position in the northern Black Sea region was determined by the ancestry of the deceased, with flexed burials belonging to local Taurians, and extended burials belonging to Greek colonists.

The 1935 basilica 
The 1935 basilica is the most famous basilica excavated in Chersonesus. The original name is unknown so "1935" refers to the year it was opened. The basilica was probably built in the 6th century on the site of an earlier temple, assumed by historians to be a synagogue, itself replacing a small temple dating from the early days of Christianity. The 1935 basilica is often used as an image representing Chersonesos. Its picture appears on one Ukrainian banknote.

Museum contents 
As well as the archaeological sites, the museum has around 200,000 smaller items from 5 AD to the 15th century, over 5,000 of which are currently exhibited. These include:

ancient texts, including the Oath of Chersonese citizens (3rd century BC), decrees in honour of Diophantus (2nd century BC)  
a collection of coins
a mosaic of black and white pebbles and coloured stones
ancient ceramics
architectural fragments, including ancient and medieval abacuses, reliefs, the remains of ancient murals

Current studies 
The Institute of Classical Archaeology of the University of Texas at Austin and the local Archaeological Park has investigated the site since 1992. The Ukrainian government has included the site on its tentative World Heritage List. The site, however, is in danger of further urban encroachment and coastal erosion.

In 2013, "The Ancient City of Tauric Chersonese and its Chora" was listed as a UNESCO World Heritage Site.  This World Heritage Site consists of seven locations that encompass the city of Chersonesus and six plots of agricultural land.  The site was designated as a World Heritage site under the UNESCO criterion (ii) and (v). UNESCO considers these areas to show cultural lifestyles and land use of ancient populations that inhabited these areas.

During the 2014 Crimean crisis, the Crimean peninsula was annexed by Russia, but UNESCO has maintained that it will continue to recognize Crimea and its heritage sites as belonging to Ukraine.

Problems and controversies 
The encroachment of modern building in and around the ancient archaeological site, coupled with a lack of funding to prevent such development pressures, has left the site of Chersonesus firmly at risk.

In an October 2010 report titled Saving Our Vanishing Heritage, Global Heritage Fund identified Chersonesus as one of 12 worldwide sites most "On the Verge" of irreparable loss and destruction, citing insufficient management and development pressures as primary causes.

On July 29, 2015, the governor of Sevastopol, Sergey Menyaylo, controversially fired the director of the National Preserve of Tauric Chersonesos, Andrey Kulagin. He then appointed the head priest of the Russian Orthodox Cathedral of Saint Vladimir in Chersonesus, Sergiy Khalyuta, as the new director of the Preserve. This move caused heated protests from the staff of the Preserve, and all 109 members unanimously refused to work under the new director. The conflict attracted significant attention from the media, particularly due to its political connotations, given that Menyaylo had been appointed governor by Russian president Vladimir Putin, shortly after Russia's annexation of Crimea in 2014. The workers claim that the conflict between Menyaylo and Kulagin started on July 11, when Kulagin complained about a road construction project on the territory of the Preserve which had been approved by governor Menyaylo without the permits necessary for construction works in protected areas. Eventually, under pressure from the workers and locals, Father Sergiy stepped down.

See also 
 List of traditional Greek place names
 Odessa Numismatics Museum having on display coins of Chersonesus
 The bell of Chersonesus

References

Bibliography and further reading 
Anokhin, Vladilen A. The Coinage of Chersonesus: IV century B.C.–XII century A.D. Oxford: British Archaeological Reports, 1980 (paperback).
Carter, Joseph Coleman; Crawford, Melba; Lehman, Paul; Nikolaenko, Galina; Trelogan, Jessica. "The Chora of Chersonesos in Crimea, Ukraine", American Journal of Archaeology, Vol. 104, No. 4. (2000), pp. 707–741.
Carter, Joseph Coleman; Mack, Glenn Randall. Crimean Chersonesos: City, Chora, Museum, and Environs. Austin, TX: David Brown Book Company, 2003 (paperback).
Kozelsky, Mara. "Ruins into Relics: The Monument to Saint Vladimir on the Excavations of Chersonesos, 1827–57", The Russian Review, Vol. 63, No. 4. (2004), pp. 655–672.
Norwich, John Julius. Byzantium: The Early Centuries. New York: Alfred A. Knopf, 1989 (hardcover).
Saprykin, Sergey Yu. Heracleia Pontica and Tauric Chersonesus before Roman domination: (VI–I centuries B.C.). Amsterdam: A.M. Hakkert, 1997.
Stolba, Vladimir F.  Aarhus 2014.

Sources and external links

 About Chersonesos - website
 The Chersonese Collection. Iss. 14-22 (2005-2021). (The main periodical scientific edition of the Museum-Preserve "Chersonesos Taurica" in open access)
 High resolution image of antique map of this region
 Greek Inscriptions of Chersonesos, with English translation - IOSPE³ III

History of Sevastopol
Archaeological sites in Ukraine
Khazar towns
Bosporan Kingdom
Megarian colonies
Greek colonies in Crimea
Ruins in Ukraine
Populated places established in the 6th century BC
Former populated places in Crimea
Buildings and structures in Crimea
Tourist attractions in Crimea
World Heritage Sites in Ukraine
Buildings and structures in Sevastopol
Tourist attractions in Sevastopol
Ukraine in the Roman era
Cultural heritage monuments in Sevastopol
Objects of cultural heritage of Russia of federal significance